Laura Branigan is the sixth studio album by American singer Laura Branigan, released on March 21, 1990, by Atlantic Records. The album's lead single, "Moonlight on Water", reached number 59 on the Billboard Hot 100, while the second single, "Never in a Million Years", peaked at number 22 on Billboard Adult Contemporary chart. The third and final single, a cover version of Vicki Sue Robinson's 1976 song "Turn the Beat Around", failed to chart. The song "Unison" was recorded by Celine Dion the same year.

Track listing

Notes
  signifies a co-producer

Personnel
Credits adapted from the liner notes of Laura Branigan.

Musicians

 Laura Branigan – lead vocals ; background vocals ; arrangements 
 Howie Rice – drum programming, keyboards ; guitar ; synth guitar, percussion 
 Andy Goldmark – drum programming, keyboards, background vocals 
 Steve Kipner – drum programming 
 Michael Dunlap – bass ; keyboards 
 Steve Lindsey – keyboards ; drum programming ; synth strings, arrangements ; synthesizer 
 James Harrah – lead guitar ; guitar 
 Ramsey Embick – synth sax solo ; keyboards, percussion 
 Richard Perry – drum programming 
 Alfie Silas – background vocals 
 Peggi Blu – background vocals 
 Jean Johnson  – background vocals 
 Peter Wolf – arrangements, all instruments except guitars 
 Peter Maunu – guitars 
 Ina Wolf – background vocals 
 Maxi Anderson – background vocals 
 Joe Pizzulo – background vocals 
 Phillip Ingram – background vocals 
 Dorian Holley – background vocals 
 Clif Magness – keyboards, drum programming ; guitar 
 Steve Goldstein – keyboards ; drum programming 
 Brandon Fields – sax 
 Kate Markowitz – background vocals 
 Donna de Lory – background vocals 
 Jeff Porcaro – drums 
 Dennis Matkosky – drum programming, keyboards, arrangements 
 Larry Klein – bass 
 Brenda Russell – background vocals 
 Danny Peck – background vocals 
 Bill Champlin – background vocals 
 Leslie Hall – background vocals 
 Khris Kellow – drum programming, synth strings, keyboards, arrangements 
 John Robinson – hi-hat 
 Aaron Zigman – synth strings, keyboards 
 Paulinho da Costa – percussion 
 Lenny Castro – percussion 
 Mona Lisa Young – background vocals 
 Peter Bunetta – arrangements, drum programming, percussion programming, background vocals 
 Rick Chudacoff – arrangements, keyboards 
 Robbie Buchanan – keyboards 
 Dann Huff – guitar 
 Leslie Smith – background vocals 
 Joey Diggs – background vocals 
 Ivory Stone – background vocals 
 Patti Henley – background vocals 
 Michael Williams – background vocals 
 Greg Phillinganes – keyboards 
 Francine Howard – background vocals 
 Bernadette Barlow – background vocals 
 Randy Kerber – piano 
 The Pasadena Boys Choir – background vocals 
 John Barron – choir direction

Technical

 Richard Perry – production 
 Peter Wolf – production 
 Laura Branigan – production 
 Steve Lindsey – production ; co-production 
 Dennis Matkosky – production, engineering assistance 
 Peter Bunetta – production 
 Rick Chudacoff – production 
 Steve Kipner – production 
 Clif Magness – production, engineering 
 Julie Larson – production coordination 
 Ramsey Embick – engineering 
 Gabe Veltri – engineering 
 Norman (Slam) Whitfield Jr. – engineering ; mixing 
 Jess Sutcliffe – engineering 
 Paul Ericksen – engineering ; mixing 
 Andy Batwinas – engineering assistance 
 Eric Anest – engineering assistance ; engineering 
 Bill Molina – engineering assistance 
 Richard Engstrom – engineering assistance 
 Keith Cohen – mixing 
 Martin Schmelzel – engineering 
 David Schober – engineering 
 Ric Butz – engineering assistance 
 Carlos Golliher – production coordination 
 Richard Cottrell – engineering 
 Charlie Pollard – engineering assistance 
 John Karpowich – engineering assistance 
 Alan Meyerson – mixing 
 Guy DeFazio – engineering assistance 
 Van Coppock – engineering assistance 
 Charlie Brocco – engineering assistance 
 Susanne Marie Edgren – production coordination 
 Mike Kloster – engineering assistance 
 Leon Johnson – recording, engineering 
 Marnie Riley – engineering assistance 
 Bryan Arnett – engineering assistance 
 Russ Ragsdale – engineering assistance 
 Steve Egelman – engineering assistance 
 Peter Barker – engineering 
 Ken Felton – engineering assistance 
 Robert Hart – engineering assistance 
 Humberto Gatica – mixing 
 Gabe Moffat – engineering assistance 
 Gail Esposito – production coordination 
 Stephen Marcussen – mastering at Precision Lacquer (Hollywood, California)
 Doug Morris – executive production

Artwork
 Bob Defrin – art direction
 Greg Gorman – photography

Charts

Notes

References

1990 albums
Albums produced by Peter Wolf
Albums produced by Richard Perry
Atlantic Records albums
Laura Branigan albums